The 1937–38 NCAA football bowl games were the final games of the 1937 college football season and featured five games, down one from the prior season, as the Bacardi Bowl was not held. Notably, the Orange Bowl was first held in Burdine Stadium, which would be renamed for the bowl game itself in 1959.

Poll rankings
The below table lists top teams (per the AP Poll taken after the completion of the regular season), their win–loss records (prior to bowl games), and the bowls they later played in.

 The Big Ten Conference did not allow its members to participate in bowl games until the 1947 Rose Bowl.

Bowl schedule 
Rankings are from the final regular season AP Poll.

References